Corydoras virginiae, the Miguelito cory, is a species of armored catfish from the family Callichthyidae, found commonly in Peru.

Etymology
The fish is named in honor of Virginia Schwartz, the wife of aquarium-fish exporter Adolfo Schwartz who collected the type specimen.

References 

Corydoras
Taxa named by Warren E. Burgess
Fish described in 1993